Willem Mwedihanga (born 1986) is a Namibian footballer who plays for the Namibia national football team.

Mwedihanga began his soccer career playing for Teenagers Football club in Ongwediva.  He then moved to United Africa Tigers, where he made a name for himself as a no nonsense centre back. In 2012, he impressed and Joined Amazulu FC, he later left Amazulu at the end of 2014/2015 season after they got relegated and joined University of Pretoria. In 2015, he led Namibia to their 1st international Cup COSAFA Cup conceding only one goal in over 3 matches.

References

1986 births
Living people
People from Oshana Region
Namibian men's footballers
Namibia international footballers
United Africa Tigers players
AmaZulu F.C. players
Namibian expatriate footballers
Expatriate soccer players in South Africa
Namibian expatriate sportspeople in South Africa
Association footballers not categorized by position